Harrison Gilbertson (born 29 June 1993) is an Australian actor.

Early life
Gilbertson was born in Adelaide, South Australia, the son of Julie Sloan and Brian Gilbertson.

Career
Gilbertson began acting at the age of six when he played the character of Sorrow in a local production of Madama Butterfly. He made his screen debut in 2002, playing the role of Greggy in Australian Rules. His big break came in 2009 when he landed the lead role of Billy Conway in Accidents Happen. Reviewers commended his performance and acting abilities.

His US debut was in the indie Virginia, directed by screenwriter Dustin Lance Black. He won the 2010 AFI Young Actor Award for his performance as Frank Tiffin in Beneath Hill 60. Also in 2014, he appeared in Need for Speed and the thriller ghost feature, Haunt. He appeared in the indie Australian movie My Mistress, a romance about a young man who becomes infatuated with his neighbor, a dominatrix. He appeared as Michael Fitzhubert in the miniseries remake of Picnic at Hanging Rock alongside Natalie Dormer and Samara Weaving. in 2018, Gilbertson played the role of Sean in director Assaf Bernstein's psychological thriller, Look Away, which starred India Eisley, Mira Sorvino and Jason Isaacs.

Filmography

Film

Television

Awards and nominations

References

External links

 

1993 births
21st-century Australian male actors
Australian male film actors
Male actors from Adelaide
Living people